Yao Simon Koffi (born 28 October 1982) is an Ivorian footballer.

Club career

Youth career
Yao Simon began his footballing career in 1997 in Ivory Coast with Abidjan-based club, ASEC Mimosas. In 1999, he moved back to his home town, Bondoukou where he played for Sacraboutou Sport de Bondoukou for one year.

Ivory Coast
Yao Simon began his professional footballing career in Ivory Coast in 2000 with Bouna-based club, Sabé Sports de Bouna. He made appearances in the 2000–01 Ligue 1 and the 2001–02 Tunisian Cup.

Tunisia
He first moved out of Ivory Coast in 2001 to North Africa and more accurately to Tunisia where he signed a one-year contract with Bizerte-based club, CA Bizertin. He made appearances in the 2001–02 Tunisian Ligue Professionnelle 1 and the 2001–02 Tunisian Cup for the Bizerte-based club.

In 2002, he moved to Gafsa where he signed a one-year contract with another Tunisian Ligue Professionnelle 1 club, EGS Gafsa. He made appearances in the 2002–03 Tunisian Ligue Professionnelle 1 and the 2002–03 Tunisian Cup.

In 2003, he moved to Hammam Sousse where he signed a two-year contract with another Tunisian Ligue Professionnelle 1 club, ES Hammam-Sousse.

In 2005, he moved to Jendouba where he signed a one-year contract with another Tunisian Ligue Professionnelle 1 club, Jendouba Sport. He made appearances in the 2005–06 Tunisian Ligue Professionnelle 1 and the 2005–06 Tunisian Cup.

In 2006, he moved to Kasserine where he signed a one-year contract with another Tunisian Ligue Professionnelle 1 club, AS Kasserine. He made appearances in the 2006–07 Tunisian Ligue Professionnelle 1.

In 2007, he moved to Béni Khalled where he signed a one-year contract with another Tunisian Ligue Professionnelle 1 club, ES Beni-Khalled. He made appearances in the 2007–08 Tunisian Ligue Professionnelle 1 and the 2007–08 Tunisian Cup.

In 2008, he moved to M'saken where he signed a one-year contract with another Tunisian Ligue Professionnelle 1 club, CS M'saken. He made appearances in the 2008–09 Tunisian Ligue Professionnelle 1.

United Arab Emirates
In 2011, he again moved out of Ivory Coast and this time to the Middle East and more accurately to the United Arab Emirates where he signed a six-month contract with UAE First Division League club, Al-Urooba. He made his UAE First Division League debut on 29 January 2012 in a 1–0 loss against Al-Khaleej Club.

Libya
In 2009, he again moved out to a North African country and this time to Libya where he signed a one-year contract with Club Africain Libya.

Lebanon
In 2010, he moved to Western Asia and more accurately to Lebanon where he signed a one-year contract with Tyre-based, Salam Sour.

Back to Tunisia
In 2011, he moved back to Tunisia and more accurately to Monastir where he signed a one-year contract with US Monastir. He did not make any official appearance for the Monastir-based club.

Sudan
In 2012, he moved back to North Africa and more accurately to Sudan where he signed a one-year contract with capital city, Khartoum-based, Al-Khartoum Al-Watani SC. He made appearances in the 2013 Sudan Premier League and also the 2013 Sudan Cup.

In 2013, he moved to Al-Fashir where he signed a two-year contract with Sudan Premier League club, Al-Hilal Al-Fasher ESC.

Personal life
Yao Simon has three brothers and has one younger sister. He has already lost a sister who was older than him back in 2012. His younger brother Mechac Koffi is also a player. He is married and lives with his wife and son in Slovenia.

References

1982 births
Living people
People from Bondoukou
Ivorian footballers
Ivorian expatriate footballers
Association football midfielders
Expatriate footballers in Tunisia
Ivorian expatriate sportspeople in Tunisia
Expatriate footballers in Libya
Ivorian expatriate sportspeople in Libya
Expatriate footballers in the United Arab Emirates
Ivorian expatriate sportspeople in the United Arab Emirates
Expatriate footballers in Sudan
Ivorian expatriate sportspeople in Sudan
Expatriate footballers in Slovenia
CA Bizertin players
EGS Gafsa players
ES Hammam-Sousse players
Jendouba Sport players
AS Kasserine players
ES Beni-Khalled players
CS M'saken players
US Monastir (football) players
Al Khartoum SC players
Al Urooba Club players
UAE First Division League players